Price's Mill, also known as Calliham's (Callaham's) Mill, Stone's Mill, and Park's Mill, is a water-powered gristmill about  east of the town of Parksville on South Carolina Highway 33-138 (Price's Mill Road) at Stevens Creek in McCormick County. Its name in the USGS Geographic Names Information System is Prices Mill. It was built in the 1890s and was named to the National Register of Historic Places on November 22, 1972. At this time, it was one of the few remaining water-powered gristmills in South Carolina.

History
David Calliham, who was son of Nicholas Callaham and was born in Virginia, acquired land on Stevens Creek in Ninety-Six District, South Carolina, around 1768. He established a gristmill on the creek. He died prior to 1784.

In addition to the gristmill, a cotton gin and a flour mill have operated nearby. These have been destroyed by floods.

The current mill building was constructed in the 1890s. Starting in 1910, R. A. Price operated the mill. In his early work, he took a toll of the meal ground for farmers. He died in 1968. His son, John M. Price, took over the mill. By this time toll milling ceased and the mill purchased corn to grind meal. He marketed the cornmeal under the mill's own label in McCormick and Greenwood County retail stores. In this period, he had an employee.

According to a 2003 travel guide, the mill is no longer operated.

Architecture

The mill is a two-story, frame building with a gable roof. It is constructed of rough-hewn pine. It has  by  exposed beams that are mortised and doweled. The building's foundation is brick piers. A steel cyclone air cleaner can be seen on its roof in photographs.

They are enclosed in a wooden housing. The upper or runner stone has a round hole. The lower bedstone has a square hole. Grain enters through a funnel and exits into a bin. The stones can be raised or lowered to adjust the texture of the product.

A rock and mortar dam, which was built in the early 19th century, was used at the mill to impound Steven's Creek.

References

External links

Grinding mills on the National Register of Historic Places in South Carolina
Historic American Engineering Record in South Carolina
Industrial buildings completed in 1890
Buildings and structures in McCormick County, South Carolina
Watermills in the United States
Grinding mills in South Carolina
National Register of Historic Places in McCormick County, South Carolina